Uroconger erythraeus is an eel in the family Congridae (conger/garden eels). It was described by Peter Henry John Castle in 1982. It is a marine, deep water-dwelling eel which is known from the Red Sea, in the western Indian Ocean.

References

Congridae
Fish described in 1982